The Palais Rothschild (at Prinz-Eugen-Straße 26) is a former palatial residence in Vienna, Austria. It was one of five Palais Rothschild in the city that were owned by members of the Rothschild banking family of Austria.

History
It was the second Palais Rothschild commissioned by Baron Albert von Rothschild, on the same street as his larger Palais Albert Rothschild at Prinz-Eugen-Straße 20-22 (demolished in 1954).

It was designed and built in 1894 by the theatre architects Ferdinand Fellner and Hermann Helmer. The building is four storeys high and was designed in a neobaroque style.

Like all Jewish property at the time, it was thoroughly plundered by the Nazis during their occupation of Austria. However, the building survived without structural damage and today serves as the Brazilian embassy in Vienna.

External links

burgen-austria.com - Palais Rothschild (Prinz-Eugen-Straße 26)
planet-vienna.com - Palais Rothschild (Prinz-Eugen-Straße 26)

Rothschild Albert
Houses completed in 1894
Rothschild family residences
Art Nouveau architecture in Vienna
Art Nouveau houses
Fellner & Helmer buildings
1894 establishments in Austria
19th-century architecture in Austria